Caranus may refer to:

People
 Caranus of Macedon, legendary progenitor of the royal house of Macedon
 Caranus (son of Philip II) (4th century BC), half-brother of Alexander the Great
 Caranus (hetairos) (died 329 BC), of Alexander the Great 
 Caranus (3rd century BC), probably a relative of the hetairos Caranus, whose wedding feast was described in a letter by Hippolochus
 Saint Caraunus of Chartres, 1st or 5th century Christian missionary in Gaul
 Kalanos (4th century BCE), Hindu Brahmin and philosopher, called Caranus by Diodorus Siculus

Other uses
 Karanos, Chania, a village in the Chania regional unit